Ostrów  is a village in Ropczyce-Sędziszów County, Subcarpathian Voivodeship, in south-eastern Poland. It is the seat of the gmina (administrative district) called Gmina Ostrów.

The village has a population of 1,500.

References
Notes

Villages in Ropczyce-Sędziszów County